Paraburkholderia mimosarum is a gram-negative, catalase and oxidase-positive non-spore-forming, rod-shaped bacterium from the genus Paraburkholderia and the family Burkholderiaceae. P. mimosarum is able to nodulate tropical plant species, mainly from the genus Mimosa.

References

mimosarum
Bacteria described in 2007